Druelle Balsac is a commune in the department of Aveyron, southern France. The municipality was established on 1 January 2017 by merger of the former communes of Druelle (the seat) and Balsac.

Population

See also 
Communes of the Aveyron department

References 

Communes of Aveyron